Justice Case may refer to:

Judges' Trial, war crimes prosecution of Nazi jurists and lawyers also known as the Justice Case
Clarence E. Case, associate justice and chief justice of the New Jersey Supreme Court
William S. Case, associate justice of the Connecticut Supreme Court